Beautiful Creature is the fourth solo album by Juliana Hatfield, released in 2000.

Release
Beautiful Creature was released simultaneously with Juliana's Pony: Total System Failure.

Critical reception

According to Metacritic, Beautiful Creature received generally favorable reviews from critics.

Track listing

Personnel

Musicians
 Juliana Hatfield – vocals, guitar, bass guitar, harmonica
 Jim Boggia – guitar, background vocals
 Brian Brown – electric piano
 Wally Gagel – bass guitar, guitar, drums, keyboards
 Davíd Garza – bass guitar, guitar, piano, drums
 John Thomasson – bass guitar
 Duke Roth – cello
 Michael Hale – drums, percussion
 Andy Kravitz – drums, keyboards
 Scott Litt – drums
 Todd Philips – drums
 Damon Richardson – drums
 Jason Sutter – drums

Technical
Producers: Juliana Hatfield, Wally Gagel, Davíd Garza, Andy Kravitz, Scott Litt
Engineers: Brian Brown, Matthew Ellard, Keith Floyd, Wally Gagel, Andy Kravitz, Scott Litt
Assistant engineer: Victor Janacua
Mixing: Wally Gagel
Mastering: Brian Lee, Dr. Toby Mountain
Recorder: Wally Gagel
Programming: Wally Gagel
Photography: Gary Smith

References

Juliana Hatfield albums
2000 albums
Albums produced by Scott Litt
Zoë Records albums
Island Records albums
Albums produced by Davíd Garza